The 9th Corps, Turkish Land Forces, is a field corps. The corps headquarters is located in Erzurum, and the corps is part of the Third Army (Turkey). It is deployed along Turkey's eastern boundary.

History
Nigel Thomas's NATO Armies 1949-87, published in 1987, attributed the 4th, 8th, and 9th Corps to the Third Army.

Corps Headquarters (Erzurum)
4th Armoured Brigade; 
9th Commando Brigade; 
7th, 14th, 25th Mechanised Infantry Brigades; 
25th Border Brigade (HQ Ardahan; 1st Battalion, Artvin; 2nd Battalion, Martyr Astsb. Tuncay Güneş Barracks in Çıldır / Ardahan; 3rd and 4th Battalions at Kars), 
48th, 51st Internal Security Brigades; 
5th Infantry Rec Brigade; 
15th Rec Train; Field Medical Rec,
17th Commando Brigade
109th Artillery Regiment (Erzurum)

References

Corps of Turkey